The 2019 Jacksonville State Gamecocks football team represented Jacksonville State University as a member of the Ohio Valley Conference (OVC) during the 2019 NCAA Division I FCS football season. Led by sixth-year head coach John Grass, the Gamecocks compiled an overall record of 6–6, with a mark of 3–5 conference play, tying for fifth place in the OVC. Jacksonville State played home games at Burgess–Snow Field at JSU Stadium in Jacksonville, Alabama.

Previous season

The Gamecocks finished the 2018 season 9–4, 7–1 in OVC play to win the conference championship for the fifth consecutive year. They received the OVC's automatic bid to the FCS Playoffs, where they defeated East Tennessee State in the first round before losing in the second round to Maine.

Preseason

Preseason coaches' poll
The OVC released their preseason coaches' poll on July 22, 2019. The Gamecocks were picked to finish in first place.

Preseason All-OVC team
The Gamecocks had seven players at seven positions selected to the preseason all-OVC team.

Offense

Zerrick Cooper – QB

Josh Pearson – WR

Trae Berry – TE

Darius Anderson – OG

Hunter Sosebee – OT

Defense

Jalen Choice – LB

Marlon Bridges – DB

Schedule

Game summaries

at Southeastern Louisiana

Chattanooga

Eastern Washington

North Alabama

at Austin Peay

Tennessee State

at Eastern Illinois

Southeast Missouri State

Murray State

at UT Martin

at Tennessee Tech

Eastern Kentucky

Ranking movements

References

Jacksonville State
Jacksonville State Gamecocks football seasons
Jacksonville State Gamecocks football